Marlenis Mesa (born 20 April 1974) is a Cuban rower. She competed in the women's lightweight double sculls event at the 2000 Summer Olympics.

References

1974 births
Living people
People from Cifuentes, Cuba
Cuban female rowers
Olympic rowers of Cuba
Rowers at the 2000 Summer Olympics
Pan American Games medalists in rowing
Pan American Games gold medalists for Cuba
Pan American Games silver medalists for Cuba
Rowers at the 2003 Pan American Games
21st-century Cuban women